Pilica Castle - Neo-Renaissance castle (or palace) located in Pilica, in Zawiercie County, Silesian Voivodeship, in Poland. The castle is located in the Kraków-Częstochowa Upland. Encircled by bastion fortifications, the castle is made up of four wings, surrounding an interior courtyard.

The castle is surrounded by a 10 ha park with diverse fauna and flora. There is a Classicist well in the park.

See also
Castles in Poland

References

Castles in Silesian Voivodeship